NGC 420 is a lenticular galaxy of type S0 located in the constellation Pisces. It was discovered on September 12, 1784 by William Herschel. It was described by Dreyer as "faint, pretty small, round, brighter middle."

References

External links
 

0420
17840912
Pisces (constellation)
Lenticular galaxies
004320